Groveland is a census-designated place (CDP) in Tuolumne County, California. The 2020 United States census reported Groveland's population was 540.

Groveland was created as a CDP prior to the 2010 census; previously it was part of Groveland-Big Oak Flat CDP.

History
Groveland has always been an important stop on the highway to Yosemite but really grew in the early 1900s with the development of the Tuolumne River Hetch-Hetchy water project for the city of San Francisco. Groveland is adjacent to the Stanislaus National Forest and is known for the historic Iron Door Saloon.

Groveland was originally a gold rush town and then became a sleepy farming community until the San Francisco Hetch Hetchy water project made it their headquarters and built a railroad yard and hospital for the work crews (both now gone). From 1915 till 1935, Groveland was a boom town supporting seven hotels, 10,000 residents and much activity.  When the work crews left, the town again became a minor stop on the way to Yosemite until the Boise Cascade company built the Pine Mountain Lake community with a first class golf course, an airport and lake and staked out 5,000 lots.  This development has since grown from a summer home area to a retirement community to a thriving neighborhood with year-round families, boosting the once sleepy Groveland to a travel and vacation destination in its own right.

Groveland is the main town on the Highway 120 route to Yosemite National Park, and boasts numerous lodging and restaurant businesses. 

Tioga High School and Tenaya Elementary School are located in Groveland.

Geography
According to the United States Census Bureau, the CDP covers an area of 9.6 square miles (24.8 km2), 99.94% of it land and 0.06% of it water.

Climate
This region experiences warm to very hot and dry summers, with the hottest month having an average temperature of 73.7°F.  According to the Köppen Climate Classification system, Groveland has a hot-summer Mediterranean climate, abbreviated "Csa."

Demographics

The 2010 United States Census reported that Groveland had a population of 601. The racial makeup of Groveland was 542 (90.2%) White, 2 (0.3%) African American, 9 (1.5%) Native American, 9 (1.5%) Asian, 2 (0.3%) Pacific Islander, 17 (2.8%) from other races, and 20 (3.3%) from two or more races. Hispanic or Latino of any race were 49 persons (8.2%).

The Census reported that 601 people (100% of the population) lived in households, 0 (0%) lived in non-institutionalized group quarters, and 0 (0%) were institutionalized.

There were 277 households, out of which 57 (20.6%) had children under the age of 18 living in them, 119 (43.0%) were opposite-sex married couples living together, 32 (11.6%) had a female householder with no husband present, 15 (5.4%) had a male householder with no wife present.  There were 21 (7.6%) unmarried opposite-sex partnerships, and 2 (0.7%) same-sex married couples or partnerships. 90 households (32.5%) were made up of individuals, and 41 (14.8%) had someone living alone who was 65 years of age or older. The average household size was 2.17.  There were 166 families (59.9% of all households); the average family size was 2.64.

The population was spread out, with 92 people (15.3%) under the age of 18, 42 people (7.0%) aged 18 to 24, 114 people (19.0%) aged 25 to 44, 239 people (39.8%) aged 45 to 64, and 114 people (19.0%) who were 65 years of age or older.  The median age was 49.6 years. For every 100 females, there were 104.4 males.  For every 100 females age 18 and over, there were 106.1 males.

The homeowner vacancy rate was 2.2%; the rental vacancy rate was 10.4%.  373 people (62.1% of the population) lived in owner-occupied housing units and 228 people (37.9%) lived in rental housing units.

Features
Camp Mather of the City of San Francisco, San Jose Family Camp of the City of San Jose, Berkeley Tuolumne Family Camp of the City of Berkeley, and Camp Tawonga, a Jewish summer camp, are all located east of Groveland off Hwy 120 within the Stanislaus National Forest.

References

Census-designated places in Tuolumne County, California
Census-designated places in California